Princess Maria Antonietta of Bourbon-Two Sicilies (Maria Antonietta Giuseppina Leopoldina; 16 March 1851 – 12 September 1938) was a Princess of Bourbon-Two Sicilies by birth and by her marriage to Prince Alfonso, Count of Caserta, claimant to the defunct throne of the Two Sicilies.

Family
Maria Antonietta was the eldest daughter of Prince Francis, Count of Trapani (son of Francis I of the Two Sicilies) and his wife (and niece) Archduchess Maria Isabella of Austria, Princess of Tuscany. She was an elder sister of Maria Carolina, Countess Andrzej Zamoyski.

Marriage and issue
Maria Antonietta married her first cousin Prince Alfonso, Count of Caserta, son of Ferdinand II of the Two Sicilies and his wife Maria Theresa of Austria, on 8 June 1868 in Rome. Antonietta and Alfonso had twelve children:

Prince Ferdinand Pius of Bourbon-Two Sicilies, Duke of Calabria (25 July 1869 – 17 January 1960)
 ∞ Princess Maria Ludwiga Theresia of Bavaria, daughter of Ludwig III of Bavaria. This marriage produced six children.
Prince Carlos of Bourbon-Two Sicilies (10 November 1870 – 11 November 1949)
 ∞ Mercedes, Princess of Asturias, daughter of Alfonso XII of Spain. This marriage produced three children.
 ∞ Princess Louise of Orléans, daughter of Prince Philippe, Count of Paris. This marriage produced four children.
Prince Francesco di Paola of the Two Sicilies (14 July 1873 – 26 June 1876)
Princess Maria Immaculata of Bourbon-Two Sicilies (30 October 1874 – 28 November 1947)
 ∞ Prince Johann Georg of Saxony, son of George of Saxony. This marriage produced no issue.
Princess Maria Cristina of Bourbon-Two Sicilies (10 April 1877 – 4 October 1947)
 ∞ Archduke Peter Ferdinand of Austria, Prince of Tuscany, son of Ferdinand IV, Grand Duke of Tuscany. This marriage produced four children.
Princess Maria di Grazia of Bourbon-Two Sicilies (12 August 1878 – 20 June 1973)
 ∞ Prince Luiz of Orléans-Braganza, son of Prince Gaston, Count of Eu. This marriage produced three children.
Princess Maria Giuseppina of the Two Sicilies (25 February 1880 – 22 July 1971)
Prince Gennaro of the Two Sicilies (24 January 1882 – 11 April 1944)
 ∞ Beatrice Bordessa, Countess of Villa Colli. This marriage produced no issue.
Prince Ranieri of the Two Sicilies, Duke of Castro (1883–1973)
 ∞ Countess Maria Carolina Zamoyska, daughter of Count Andrzej Przemysław Zamoyski. This marriage produced two children.
Prince Filippo of the Two Sicilies (10 December 1885 – 9 March 1949)
 ∞ Princess Marie Louise d'Orléans, daughter of Prince Emmanuel, Duke of Vendôme. This marriage produced one child.
 ∞ Odette Labori. This marriage produced no issue.
Prince Francesco d'Assisi of the Two Sicilies (13 January 1888 – 26 March 1914)
Prince Gabriele of the Two Sicilies (1 January 1897 – 22 October 1975)
 ∞ Princess Malgorzata Izabella Czartoryska, daughter of Prince Adam Ludwik Czartoryski. This marriage produced one child.
 ∞ Princess Cecylia Lubomirska, daughter of Prince Kasimierz Lubomirski. This marriage produced four children.

Honours
 : 697th Dame of the Order of Queen Maria Luisa - .

Ancestry

References

External links

1851 births
1938 deaths
19th-century Neapolitan people
Princesses of Bourbon-Two Sicilies
Italian Roman Catholics
Duchesses of Calabria
Burials at the Cimetière du Grand Jas
19th-century Roman Catholics
20th-century Roman Catholics